Ramos Arizpe is one of the 38 municipalities of Coahuila, in north-eastern Mexico. The municipal seat lies at Ramos Arizpe. The municipality covers an area of 5306.6 km².

As of 2005, the municipality had a total population of 56,708.

References

External links

Municipalities of Coahuila